The Peter J. Peel Challenge Cup, better known as the Peel Cup, was an open soccer competition that crowned the Illinois state champion until it was replaced by the Illinois Governor’s Cup in 1971.

History

Origins
Peter Peel was born in 1866 in Dublin, Ireland and moved to Chicago, Illinois when young.  He founded the first soccer association in Illinois, served as president of the Chicago Soccer League, and later became president of the United States Football Association. In 1909, he established a competition, named after himself, open to all soccer clubs in the Midwestern United States.  Proceeds from the competition went to a fund to benefit injured soccer players.  The first tournament included clubs from Chicago, Peoria, and Coal City.  Peel also had plans to include clubs from St. Louis, Detroit, and Cleveland the following year.  On October 3, 1909, the Campbell Rovers defeated Coal City 3-0 in front of a large crowd at the 124th Field Artillery Amory (52nd Street and South Cottage Grove Avenue) to win the first cup.  Until the 1914 establishment of the National Challenge Cup, the Peel Cup was among the most significant cup competition in the United States.   While it was originally intended to determine the club champion of the mid-west, the Peel Cup quickly became the tournament to determine the Illinois State Champions.  For several years it was a de facto Chicago championship, due to the large number of talented teams in the city, especially those playing in the National Soccer League of Chicago.  At the time, aside from Bethlehem Steel, teams from Chicago, New York City and Saint Louis dominated American soccer.

Name changes
After being awarded to the Olympics on November 1, 1970, the Peel Cup disappeared.  The decision was made at that time to replace it with the Governor’s Cup.  Since then, the cup has changed names multiple times based on a tradition that the first team to win it three times keeps the cup.  However, through all its name changes it continues to crown the annual Illinois State Champions and is commonly referred to as the Illinois State Cup.  The winner, and runner up, of the Illinois State Cup advances to the Regional Tournament of Champions.

Peel Shield
The Peel Cup should not be confused with the Peel Shield which was established by Peter Peel in 1912 and held until 1919 as a high school soccer competition.

2007 Final
On September 21, 2007, the cup final between RWB Adria and United Serbs was halted in the 40th minute with the score tied at 2-2 after rival fans began rioting.

Champions

Peel Cup
 1909  Campbell Rovers
 1910  Hyde Park Blues
 1911  Blue Island
 1912  Pullman F.C.
 1913  Pullman F.C.
 1914  Pullman F.C.
 1915  Pullman F.C.
 1916  Chicago Americans
 1917  Harvey F.C.
 1918  Joliet F.C.
 1919  Scottish-Americans
 1920  Bricklayers and Masons F.C.
 1921  Pullman F.C.
 1922  Olympia
 1923  Pullman F.C.
 1924  Bricklayers and Masons F.C.
 1925  Pullman F.C.
 1926  Pullman F.C.
 1927  Coal City Maroons
 1928  Chicago Sparta
 1929  Chicago Sparta
 1930  Chicago Sparta
 1931  Chicago Sparta
 1932  Chicago Sparta
 1933  Chicago Sparta
 1934  Wieboldts
 1935  Harvey United
 1936  Maccabees A.C.
 1937  Chicago Sparta
 1938  Manhattan Beer
 1939  Chicago Sparta
 1940  Vikings
 1941  Vikings
 1942  Chicago Slovak
 1943  Chicago Slovak / Vikings
 1944  Vikings
 1945  Swedish-Americans
 1946  Chicago Sparta
 1947  Chicago Sparta
 1948  Chicago Sparta
 1949  Vikings
 1950  A.A.C. Eagles
 1951  Chicago Slovak
 1952  Chicago Falcons
 1953  Chicago Falcons
 1954  A.A.C. Eagles
 1955  A.A.C. Eagles
 1956  Ukrainian Lions
 1957  A.A.C. Eagles
 1958  Schwaben
 1959  Kickers
 1960  Kickers
 1961  Kickers
 1962  Kickers
 1963  A.A.C. Eagles
 1964  Kickers
 1965  Olympics
 1966  Hansa
 1967  Kickers
 1968  Olympic
 1969  Chicago Sparta / Kickers
 1970  Olympics

Illinois Governor’s Cup
 1971  Schwaben
 1972  Ukrainian Lions
 1973  Croatans
 1974  Ukrainian Lions
 1975  Wisla
 1976  Croatans
 1977  Ukrainian Lions

Fred W. Netto Cup
 1978  Croatan
 1979  San Francisco
 1980  Winged Bull
 1981  Wisla
 1982  Winged Bull
 1983  Winged Bull

George E. Fishwick Cup
 1984 Wisla
 1985 Wisla
 1986 Croatan
 1987 Wisla

William P. Hemmings Cup
 1988 RWB Adria
 1989 RWB Adria
 1990 Schwaben
 1991 Schwaben
 1992 Chicago Pegasus
 1993 RWB Adria

Alfredo V. Arias Cup
 1994 RWB Adria
 1995 Chicago Pegasus
 1996 United Romanians
 1997 United Romanians
 1998 Santos Degollado
 1999 A.A.C. Eagles
 2000 A.A.C. Eagles
 2001 Morelia
 2002 RWB Adria
 2003 RWB Adria

George L. Chazaro Cup
 2004 Vikings
 2005 RWB Adria
 2006 RWB Adria
 2007 Suspended

Frank Mariani Cup
 2008 RWB Adria
 2009 Hellenic United / Ho Chunk
 2010 RWB Adria
 2011 International SC
 2012 Hellenic United
 2013 RWB Adria
 2014 Vikings AA
 2015 Vikings AA

External links
 Illinois State Open Competitions

Soccer in Illinois
Soccer cup competitions in the United States
American soccer trophies and awards